The Nordviertel is the most northern borough of the city district Stadtbezirk I (Stadtmitte/Frillendorf/Huttrop) in Essen.

Geography and demographics
Nordviertel has 7,308 inhabitants and is therefore one of the smallest boroughs of Essen. It has an area of 2.86 km² and its average elevation is 48 metres above sea level.

Essen